The Mendocino Transit Authority  (MTA) is a public bus system that serves Ukiah, the Mendocino Valley, and coastal regions of Mendocino County, California.

MTA began service in 1976 under a joint powers agreement between the County of Mendocino and the cities of Fort Bragg, Point Arena, Ukiah and Willits.

Routes
MTA operates several routes, most of which radiate from Ukiah.

^ All routes make "Flag Stops": at a safe location for the bus to pull out of traffic wave the bus down.

Previous Routes

Fares 
Current Fares can be found at https://mendocinotransit.org/fares/

MTA offers many pass and punch card options for frequent riders:

 16 ride punch card - allows riders to ride through one or more fare zones for 1 punch per zone (~25 to 30% discount)
 1, 2, and 3 zone full-fare monthly passes]
 Summer Youth Pass

MTA also provides the following discounts:

 ~50% fare for Seniors (62+) and People With Disabilities (With MTA discount ID)
 Free Local Fares for Mendocino College Students with Student ID
 Discounted fares for regional routes 65, 95

Previous Roster

Current Roster 
This roster may be incomplete

References

External links
Official website

Bus transportation in California
Public transportation in Mendocino County, California
Public transportation in Sonoma County, California
Transit agencies in California